Michael Arthur Byers (September 11, 1946 — September 16, 2010) was a Canadian ice hockey right wing. He played in the National Hockey League for the Toronto Maple Leafs, Philadelphia Flyers, Los Angeles Kings, and Buffalo Sabres between 1967 and 1972. He also played in the World Hockey Association for the Los Angeles Sharks, New England Whalers, and Cincinnati Stingers between 1972 and 1976.

In his NHL career, Byers played in 166 games, scoring 42 goals and 34 assists.  He played in 263 WHA games, scoring 83 goals and adding 74 assists.

Career statistics

Regular season and playoffs

External links
 

1946 births
2010 deaths
Buffalo Sabres players
Canadian expatriate ice hockey players in the United States
Canadian ice hockey right wingers
Cincinnati Stingers players
Los Angeles Kings players
Los Angeles Sharks players
New England Whalers players
Philadelphia Flyers players
Quebec Aces (AHL) players
Rochester Americans players
Ice hockey people from Toronto
Toronto Maple Leafs players
Toronto Marlboros players
Tulsa Oilers (1964–1984) players
20th-century Canadian people